Generic or generics may refer to:

In business
 Generic term, a common name used for a range or class of similar things not protected by trademark 
 Generic brand, a brand for a product that does not have an associated brand or trademark, other than the trading name of the business providing the product
 Generic trademark, a trademark that sometimes or usually replaces a common term in colloquial usage
 Generic drug, a drug identified by its chemical name rather than its brand name

In computer programming
 Generic function, a computer programming entity made up of all methods having the same name
 Generic programming, a computer programming paradigm based on method/functions or classes defined irrespective of the concrete data types used upon instantiation
 Generics in Java

In linguistics
A pronoun or other word used with a less specific meaning, such as:
 generic you
generic he or generic she
generic they
 Generic mood, a grammatical mood used to make generalized statements like Snow is white
 Generic antecedents, referents in linguistic contexts, which are classes

In mathematics
 Generic filter, in mathematical logic and set theory, a tool for studying axiom independence
 Generic point, a point of an algebraic variety, which has no other property than those that are shared by all other points, or, in scheme theory, a point that contains all other points
 Generic polynomial, a polynomial whose coefficients are indeterminates
 Generic property, a formal definition of a property shared by almost all objects of a specific type
 GENERIC formalism, a mathematical framework to describe irreversible phenomena in thermodynamics
 1-generic, in computability, a kind of "random" sequence

Other
 Generic role-playing game system, a framework that provides rule mechanics for any setting—world or environment or genre
 Genus, the generic name for classification of an organism in taxonomy
 Album – Generic Flipper, an album by the band Flipper
 Generic, the surname of the titular character and his family on Bobby’s World

See also
 Generic name (disambiguation)